Cranfield School of Management, established in 1967, is a business school that is part of Cranfield University in Bedfordshire, United Kingdom. It was ranked Top 10 in the UK and 34th in Europe in the Financial Times European Business Schools 2021 rankings. Cranfield School of Management is triple accredited by the Association of MBAs (AMBA), EQUIS and AACSB. Cranfield University, the UK's only wholly postgraduate university, specialises in science, technology, engineering, and management.

Campus 
The Cranfield University campus, which includes the School of Management, is located just outside the village of Cranfield in the Bedfordshire countryside, near Milton Keynes.

The School's Management Information Resource Centre offers access to electronic resources and is equipped with a Bloomberg Suite, a series of terminals offering access to live financial services news and data on industries, markets, economic indicators, equities, bonds and derivatives. The school also has a purpose-built residential management training centre.

History 
 1937: an RAF airbase was set up near Cranfield village in Bedfordshire in 1937 in the build-up to the Second World War.
 1946: the airbase became the site of a College of Aeronautics to provide education and training for aeronautical engineers. Aspects of management were a feature of Cranfield programmes from the late 1940s.
 1953: the Work Study School, which evolved to become Cranfield School of Management, opened.
 1964: the first Cranfield MBA programme was run.
 1967: Cranfield School of Management was founded.
 1969: Cranfield was awarded its Royal Charter giving it university status and the power to confer degrees under the new name of Cranfield Institute of Technology.
 1993: Cranfield Institute of Technology changed its name to Cranfield University.
 2001: Cranfield SoM gained Triple Crown accreditation, one of the first few to do so in the UK.

Programmes

MBA programme 
The Cranfield MBA is a full-time one-year programme beginning in September each year. The class comprises around 100 students drawn from 30 to 40 countries.

The Cranfield Executive MBA is a two-year part-time programme that starts in January each year. The programme is offered in a weekend format and has a focus on real-world learning and leadership development.

Master's Programmes 
The School offers a portfolio of full-time one-year Master’s courses consisting of core and elective modules and a dissertation:

 Finance and Management MSc
 Investment Management MSc
 Management MSc
 Management and Corporate Sustainability MSc
 Management and Entrepreneurship MSc
 Management and Human Resource Management MSc
 Logistics and Supply Chain Management MSc
 Procurement and Supply Chain Management MSc
 Strategic Marketing MSc

Postgraduate Apprenticeships 
Since the introduction of the Apprenticeship Levy, Cranfield School of Management has been one of the largest Level 7 Senior Leader Apprenticeship providers in the UK.

 Senior Leader Apprenticeship+ Executive MBA
 Senior Leader Apprenticeship+ Management and Leadership MSc
 Senior Leader Apprenticeship+ Marketing and Leadership MSc
 Senior Leader Apprenticeship+ Logistics and Supply Chain Management MSc (Executive)
 Retail and Digital Banking MSc

Doctoral programmes 
The School offers a PhD programme on both a full-time and part-time basis and an International Executive Doctorate (DBA) on a part-time basis.

Open Executive programmes 
Its portfolio of executive programmes is designed to develop personal leadership effectiveness and improve long-term business results, enabling managers to make the personal transitions required at key points in their careers.

Rankings 
 
The Cranfield School of Management is highly ranked globally as well as nationally.

As an exclusively postgraduate university, the University is excluded from the Times Higher Education World Rankings, The Times World Rankings, The Complete University Guide and The Guardian, which focus on helping prospective undergraduate students to compare universities.

Full-time MBA ranking

 The Financial Times 2019 ranking of full-time MBA programmes, ranked 9th in the UK, 18th in Europe and 76th in the world.
 The Financial Times Full-time Top MBA programmes for entrepreneurship 2018 ranked 8th in the UK and 18th in the world.
 The Bloomberg Businessweek European Best B-Schools ranking of full-time MBA programmes 2019-20, ranked 16th in Europe overall, 2nd in Europe for the learning experience, 7th in Europe for networking and 9th in Europe for entrepreneurship.
 The Economist Which MBA? Rankings 2019, ranked 5th in the UK, 14th in Europe and 59th in the world.
 The QS Global MBA Rankings 2021 ranked 9th in the UK, 29th in Europe and 79th in the world.

Executive MBA ranking

 The Financial Times ranking of Executive MBA programmes 2020, ranked 8th in the UK, 88th in the world, 3rd in the UK for Percentage of Women Students, 13th in the EU for Salary Increase Percentage and 1st in the UK for Satisfaction Rate.

Management MSc ranking

 The Economist Which MBA? Masters in Management (MiM) 2019 ranking, ranked 3rd in the UK and 30th in the world.
 The Financial Times: Masters In Management 2020, ranked 9th in the UK and 78th in the world.
 The QS World University Rankings: Masters in Management ranking 2021, ranked 6th in the UK, 26th in the world and 14th in the world for employability.

Finance and Management MSc ranking

 The Financial Times Masters in Finance Pre-experience ranking 2018, ranked 6th in the UK and 32nd in the world.
 The QS World University Rankings: Masters in Finance Rankings 2021, ranked 9th in the UK and 40th in the world.

Logistics and Supply Chain Management MSc ranking

 The QS World University Rankings: Masters in Supply Chain Management Rankings 2021, ranked 2nd in the UK and 11th in the world.

Strategic Marketing MSc ranking

 The QS World University Rankings: Masters in Marketing Rankings 2021, ranked 5th in the UK and 16th in the world.

Executive Education ranking

 The Executive Education 2020 FT Rankings, ranked top 10 in the UK, top 30 in Europe and top 40 in the world.

International links 
Cranfield School of Management has Memoranda of Understanding with:
 Darden Graduate School of Business Administration, University of Virginia, USA
 China Europe International Business School, Shanghai
 Indian Institute of Management, Bangalore, India
 Melbourne Business School, Australia
 Stellenbosch University, South Africa
 Fundação Getúlio Vargas, São Paulo, Brazil
 University of Chile
 Kobe University, Japan
 Nanyang Technological University, Singapore
 IPADE, Mexico.

The School of Management has run programmes with and hosted exchange students from a number of business schools around the world including ESADE, Spain, EM Lyon, France, University of Cape Town, South Africa and University of Ghana, Accra, Ghana

Notable alumni 
The alumni body of Cranfield School of Management is an international network of professional managers from business, the professions, the public and not-for-profit sectors. Currently, the network includes more than 18,000 professional managers in over 120 countries.

Cranfield University are in the top 1% of institutions in the world for alumni who hold CEO positions at the world's top companies according to the Centre for World University Rankings, 2017.

 Nick Jenkins – Founder of online greetings card retailer Moonpig, former "dragon" on the BBC Two business series Dragons' Den.
 Karan Bilimoria – Founder and Chairman, Cobra Beer Ltd
 Crispin Blunt – Member of Parliament for Reigate.
 Andy Bond – Former CEO, Asda.
 Warren East – CEO, Rolls-Royce Holdings.
 Andy Palmer – Former CEO, Aston Martin. 
 Andy Harrison – Chairman, Dunelm Group.
 John Hull – Professor of Derivatives and Risk Management at the University of Toronto.
 Antony Jenkins – former Group Chief Executive, Barclays.
 Ahmed Aly – CEO, Nile Air.
 Martin Lamb – Former Chief Executive, IMI plc.
 Charlie Mayfield – Former Chairman, John Lewis Partnership.
 John McFarlane – Former Group Chairman, Barclays
 Lara Morgan – Entrepreneur and Investor, Company Shortcuts.
 Ted Tuppen – Founder and former CEO, Enterprise Inns Plc.
 Sarah Willingham – letssavesomemoney.com, former "dragon" on the BBC Two business series Dragons' Den.
 Akinwunmi Ambode – Former Governor Lagos State, Nigeria.
 Juan Rafael Elvira Quesada – Served as Secretary of the Environment and Natural Resources.
 Nigel Doughty – Former co-chairman and co-founder, Doughty Hanson & Co.
 Siddhartha Lal – Chief executive officer and Managing Director, Eicher Motors, and Chairman & Managing Director of VE Commercial Vehicles.
 Michael Bear (Lord Mayor) – The 683rd Lord Mayor of London.
Samer Majali – Former CEO, Royal Jordanian airlines and SaudiGulf Airlines.
 Winnie Byanyima – Executive Director, UNAIDS.
 Clifford Braimah – Managing Director, Ghana Water Company Limited.
 Elena Ambrosiadou – CEO, IKOS Asset Management.
 Debra Charles – Founder and CEO, Novacroft.
 Kito De Boer – Former Consultant, McKinsey & Co.
 Omobola Johnson – Senior Partner, TLcom Capital LLP.
 Riz Lateef – Journalist and newsreader, BBC.
 Dr Alice Maynard – Director, Future Inclusion.
 Angus Thirlwell – CEO and Co-Founder, Hotel Chocolat.
 Dr Andy Wood – CEO, Adnams brewery.

References

External links 
 Cranfield School of Management

Business schools in England
Management, School of